Hinano Yoshikawa (吉川ひなの, born Ai Takada; December 21, 1979) is a Japanese actress, fashion model and singer.

Biography

Life and career 
Yoshikawa was born on December 21, 1979. In Higashikurume, Tokyo, Japan. She started her fashion model career at the age of 14 and still is a model.

She made her acting debut in 1997 in Moonlight Serenade (Setouchi munraito serenade). The following year she made her international debut in Jean-Pierre Limosin's Tokyo Eyes, a Franco-Japanese film, in which she played Hinano. This movie earned her the Best Debut Actress award at the Japanese Professional Movie Awards in 1999.

The first TV series she appeared in was The Last Song (Seikimatsu no uta) broadcast in 1998.

Personal life
In 1999, Yoshikawa married Izam, singer of Japanese visual kei rock band Shazna, only to file for separation two months later and divorce two months after that. Both the marriage and divorce caused a scandal.

Filmography

Cinema 
 Moonlight Serenade (Setouchi munraito serenade), 1997
 Tokyo Eyes, 1998
 Inu no eiga (lit. Dog's Movie), 2005 
 Who's Camus Anyway? (Kamyu nante shiranai), 2005 
 Haunted Highway (Death Ride), 2006

 TV series 
 The Last Song (TV series) (Seikimatsu no uta), 1998
 Waratte iitomo, 2000-2002 
 Golden Bowl (Gōruden bouru), 2002

 Music 

Discography
 I Am Pink'' (CD album, Pony Canyon PCCA-01200), 1998

References 

2.Patronage cosmetic of Yoshikawa doll

1979 births
People from Higashikurume, Tokyo
People from Nerima
Japanese actresses
Living people
Japanese television personalities
Japanese female models
Models from Tokyo Metropolis